Earthna Jacquet is a former professional tennis player in the United States.  In 1955, he was the national Negro Singles Champion.  He was from Los Angeles.

Personal life 
After his retirement from tennis at age 29, he worked at a truck driver and a tennis coach.

References 

American male tennis players
Year of birth missing (living people)
Living people
Tennis players from Los Angeles